Zverinac is a small Croatian island in the Zadar Archipelago of the Adriatic Sea. It occupies 4.2 km2 and is populated by 43 people, with a population density of 10.29 persons per square kilometer. Its highest peak is 111 metres high.

According to the Croatian Culturenet website, the island was first mentioned in 1421 as Suiran, a possession of the Zadar noblemen. In the island's settlement is the baroque palace of the family of Fanfong from 1746 . There are Roman ruins in the Poripišće uvala.

References

Islands of Croatia
Islands of the Adriatic Sea